Tomáš Pastor (born September 6, 1992) is a Czech professional ice hockey player. He is currently playing for AZ Havířov of the Czech Chance liga.

Pastor made his Czech Extraliga debut playing with HC Vítkovice Steel during the 2012-13 Czech Extraliga season.

References

External links

1992 births
Living people
BK Mladá Boleslav players
HC Vítkovice players
Czech ice hockey defencemen
Sioux Falls Stampede players
Sportspeople from Ostrava
HC Havířov players
Hokej Šumperk 2003 players
Orli Znojmo players
HC Frýdek-Místek players
MsHK Žilina players
Czech expatriate ice hockey players in the United States
Czech expatriate ice hockey players in Slovakia